The 2011 Belk Bowl, the 10th edition of the game, was a post-season American college football bowl game, held on December 27, 2011, at Bank of America Stadium in Charlotte, North Carolina as part of the 2011–12 NCAA Bowl season.

The game was telecast at 8:00 p.m. ET on ESPN, and featured the Cardinals from the Big East Conference and the Louisville NC State Wolfpack from the Atlantic Coast Conference.

Previously known as the Meineke Car Care Bowl in 2010, the 2011 contest was the first under its new name and sponsorship agreement with Belk, the Charlotte-based department store chain.

Louisville-NC State is expected to become a yearly game as in 2014 Louisville will join the ACC and is expected to replace Maryland in the Atlantic Division (where NC State plays).

Teams

Louisville

Louisville advanced to its second straight Bowl game under second year head coach Charlie Strong. It is the first time the Cardinals have advanced to back-to-back bowl games since 2005–06, their first two years as members of the Big East. Louisville enters the game with a record of 7–5, and having gone 5–2 in Big East play. The Cardinals experienced an up-and-down season. They started out 1–1 before going on the road and beating their hated in-state rival Kentucky 24–17 for the first time in 4 tries, in a game where highly touted freshman quarterback Teddy Bridgewater made his debut, filling in midway through for the injured Will Stein. Louisville lost three straight to drop to 2–4, before winning three straight to go to 5–4. One notable event occurred midway through the Cards' 16–14 win over Rutgers, in which senior cornerback Anthony Conner broke his neck and was carted off the field. Louisville became Bowl-eligible on November 19, in a 34–20 win at Connecticut.

NC State

Scoring summary
Source

Statistics

References

Belk Bowl
Duke's Mayo Bowl
Louisville Cardinals football bowl games
NC State Wolfpack football bowl games
Belk Bowl